Joseph Willie "Turkey" Jones (born January 7, 1948) is a former American football defensive end who spent eleven seasons in the National Football League (NFL) with the Cleveland Browns (1970–1973; 1975–1978), Philadelphia Eagles (1974–1975) and Washington Redskins (1979–1980).

Turkey nickname
Per Jones' daughter, Leone Jones Hopewell, he did earn his "Turkey" nickname just before Thanksgiving during his rookie season with the Browns in 1970. The veterans on the team pulled a prank on the rookies by sending them off to distant farms to get nonexistent "free turkeys" for the holiday. Jones continued his futile search for hours, long after his fellow rookies had abandoned theirs. He fell for the same prank again the following year. The not-true story his nickname was because he bobbed his head like a turkey when he ran so some college teammates started calling him Turkey. By the end of his rookie season, he had worked his way into the starting lineup, but a knee injury sidelined him in 1972.  Cleveland traded him to the Philadelphia Eagles in 1974, but he was cut the next year, and he re-signed with Cleveland.

Terry Bradshaw incident
In 1976, Jones was back in the starting lineup when Pittsburgh rolled into Cleveland for a game with their biggest rivals, the Browns.  Although Hal Lebovitz called it Jones' best game at the end of the third quarter, Jones' legacy as the instigator in one of the dirtiest plays (according to Pittsburgh fans), or great plays (according to Cleveland fans) in recent memory was made in the 4th. Jones lined up for a play, beat the offensive lineman (Larry Brown) and wrapped his arms around quarterback Terry Bradshaw. Whistles blew, but Jones ignored them or didn't hear them and lifted Bradshaw up high, and slammed the Pittsburgh QB on his head. As Bradshaw laid there motionless on the ground, the officials marched off a 15-yard penalty for roughing. Bradshaw ended up with a concussion, and Jones ended up with a $3,000 fine.

References

External links
 

1948 births
Living people
American football defensive ends
Tennessee State Tigers football players
Cleveland Browns players
Philadelphia Eagles players
Washington Redskins players
Players of American football from Dallas